The East Van Cross is a symbol formed by the words East written vertically and Van written horizontally in capital letters, intersecting at the shared letter A, and forming the shape of a cross.  Van is short for Vancouver, and the reference is to the city’s Eastern half, traditionally less wealthy, and harder-edged.

The East Van Cross traditionally was the work of graffiti artists, said to express the "marginality and defiance" of East Vancouver.

Starting in the 21st century, the symbol has been adopted as a city icon, most visibly expressed in the form of Monument for East Vancouver by artist Ken Lum, erected in 2010 near the intersection of Clark Drive and East 6th Avenue.  It has become possible to purchase clothing and jewellery bearing the East Van Cross motif.

The symbol is alluded to in the packaging of one beer made by an East Vancouver brewing company.

References

Symbols of Canada